The Australian Champion Stayer is awarded annually to the Thoroughbred horse whose performances in Australia over distances of 2,200 metres (approximately 11 furlongs) and greater are deemed to be the superior to its rivals.
It has been awarded since the 1999 - 2000 season.

Other Australian Thoroughbred Awards
Australian Champion Racehorse of the Year
Australian Champion Two Year Old
Australian Champion Three Year Old
Australian Champion Sprinter
Australian Champion Middle Distance Racehorse
Australian Champion Filly or Mare
Australian Champion International Performer
Australian Champion Jumper
Australian Champion Trainer

References

Australian Thoroughbred racing awards